Willema carsoni is a species of butterfly in the family Hesperiidae. It is found in Tanzania (Fwambo and Kungwe) and north-eastern Zambia.

References

Butterflies described in 1898
Heteropterinae
Butterflies of Africa
Taxa named by Arthur Gardiner Butler